"We Were Meant to Be Lovers" is the debut single by Jim Photoglo, released in 1980 from his debut album, Photoglo. It reached No. 31 on the Billboard Hot 100, and No. 14 on the Adult Contemporary chart.

Cover versions have been recorded by Rita Remington in 1980 and David Slater in 1988. Slater's version reached No. 63 on the Billboard Country chart.

References

1980 songs
1980 debut singles
1988 singles
Jim Photoglo songs
Songs written by Jim Photoglo
20th Century Fox Records singles